Kathleen A. "Kathy" Davison (born October 1, 1945) is a Republican member of the Wyoming House of Representatives.  She is a Latter-day Saint.   she is currently sponsoring House Bill 120 to make Assisted Suicide a crime, and House Bill 132 to make the killing of an unborn child along with her mother a double murder.
With the conviction of the husband or boyfriend killing the mother. His parental rights will be terminated.

Davison and her husband William Davison are the parents of four children. She is a member of The Church of Jesus Christ of Latter-day Saints.

She retired from legislation at the end of 2014. She is still keeping active about the committees that she truly enjoyed helping out.

References

1945 births
Latter Day Saints from Wyoming
Living people
Members of the Wyoming House of Representatives